Dubovce is a village and municipality in Skalica District in the Trnava Region of western Slovakia.

History
In historical records the village was first mentioned in 1500.

Geography
The municipality lies at an altitude of 207 metres and covers an area of 8.459 km². It has a population of about 675 people.

Genealogical resources

The records for genealogical research are available at the state archive "Statny Archiv in Bratislava, Slovakia"

See also
 List of municipalities and towns in Slovakia

References

External links

 Official page
https://web.archive.org/web/20071027094149/http://www.statistics.sk/mosmis/eng/run.html
Surnames of living people in Dubovce

Villages and municipalities in Skalica District